Vivienne Spence-Gardner (born 22 January 1965) is a retired female sprinter from Jamaica, who mainly competed in the women's 100 metres during her career. She is a one-time Olympian, making her only appearance in 1988 (Seoul, South Korea). Spence set her personal best (11.41 s) in 1988.

Achievements

References
sports-reference

1965 births
Living people
Jamaican female sprinters
Olympic athletes of Jamaica
Athletes (track and field) at the 1987 Pan American Games
Athletes (track and field) at the 1988 Summer Olympics
Athletes (track and field) at the 1991 Pan American Games
Pan American Games medalists in athletics (track and field)
Pan American Games bronze medalists for Jamaica
Medalists at the 1987 Pan American Games
Olympic female sprinters
20th-century Jamaican women